Andrew Gissinger III (born July 4, 1959 in Barberton, Ohio) was a former professional football player who became the president and Chief Operating Officer of  Countrywide Home Loans, Inc. Gissinger also owned and managed a private equity company. Gissinger is the father of five sons.

Education
Gissinger was an academic All American and four-year letterman at Syracuse University where he majored in business. He was the recipient of the Joseph Alexander Award for his athletic and academic accomplishments at Syracuse University. He attended Valley Forge High School in Parma Heights, Ohio.

Football
Gissinger was a 6'5", 280 pound  offensive tackle selected with the first pick of the sixth round in the 1981 draft. He played his entire three-year NFL career for the San Diego Chargers from 1982 - 1984.  Gissinger ruptured two disks in his back which ended his professional sports career.

Banking
Gissinger served Countrywide Home Loans from 1994 through 1996, and then from 2000 through 2008 when the company was acquired by Bank of America.  While at Countrywide, Gissinger was the President and Executive Managing Director of the Home Loans division. He became famous for leading the 2007 "Protect Our House" campaign which urged Countrywide employees to take criticism of the company as a personal attack.

Bank of America retained Gissinger for a period of months after the acquisition to head several groups responsible for selling mortgages to consumers as the third highest-ranking official in the Bank of America Home Loans holding company.  He was replaced by Craig Buffie, a 24-year Bank of America veteran.
Prior to 2000, Gissinger owned and operated his own companies in Real Estate, Development and Mortgage Banking.

References

1959 births
Living people
American football offensive tackles
San Diego Chargers players
Syracuse Orange football players
American business executives
American real estate businesspeople
Corporate executives
Bank of America executives
People from Barberton, Ohio
American chief operating officers